Neil McLean may refer to:

 Neil McLean (judge) (1759–1832), judge and political figure in Upper Canada
 Neil McLean (politician) (1918–1986), British Army officer and politician, former Conservative MP for Inverness
 Neil McLean (saxophonist), American saxophonist and arranger, former member of the SuperJazz Big Band and the Magic City Jazz Orchestra
 Neil McLean (sportsman) (1857–1939), New Zealand public works contractor and sportsman
 Neil MacLean (coroner) New Zealand's first Chief Coroner

See also
 Neil Maclean (1875–1953), Scottish socialist and MP for Glasgow Govan